Moland is a former municipality in the old Aust-Agder county in Norway. The  municipality existed from 1962 until 1992 when it was merged into the present-day municipality of Arendal which is located in what is now Agder county. The administrative centre of the municipality was the village of Eydehavn which had a population of 6,011 in 1967 and 8,148 in 1992. Other villages in the municipality included Kilsund, Narestø, Saltrød, Brekka, Strengereid, Vatnebu, and Sagene. The municipality consisted of the mainland area to the north and northeast of the town of Arendal plus the islands of Flostaøya and Tverrdalsøya.

History 

During the 1960s, there were many municipal mergers across Norway due to the work of the Schei Committee.  The municipality of Moland was created on 1 January 1962 when a merger took place between the municipalities of Stokken (population: 2,783), Austre Moland (population: 1,607), and Flosta (population: 1,205) as well as Strengereid area (population: 375) of the municipality of Tvedestrand. On 1 January 1964, the Holte farm (population: 5) in Moland was transferred to Tvedestrand.

On 1 January 1992, another major municipality merger took place in this area.  The municipalities of Moland (population: 8,148), Øyestad (population: 8,679), Tromøy (population: 4,711), and Hisøy (population: 4,026) were merged with the town of Arendal (population: 12,478) to form the new, much larger, municipality of Arendal with a population of nearly 40,000 people.

Name 
The municipality was named Moland, by dropping the word Austre (meaning "eastern") from the old name of one of its predecessor municipalities: Austre Moland.  The name Moland comes from the Old Norse word  which is derived from the river name , which can be linked with the Old Norse word  which means "brave".

Coat of arms 
The coat of arms was granted on 7 January 1983. The official blazon is "Azure, a double chevron argent". This means the arms have a blue field (background) and the charge is a double chevron that looks like the letter "M". The double chevron has a tincture of argent which means it is commonly colored white, but if it is made out of metal, then silver is used. The blue color in the field symbolizes the importance of the sea for this municipality which had a long and rugged coastline. The double chevron design was chosen since it looks like the letter "M", the initial letter in the name of the municipality. The three points in the "M" also refer to the three areas that formed Moland municipality: Stokken, Flosta, and Austre Moland. The arms were designed by Oddvar André Enggav.

Government 
The municipal council  of Moland was made up of representatives that were elected to four-year terms.  The party breakdown of the final municipal council was as follows:

Notable residents 
 Tore A. Liltved, a local politician
 Thor Lund, a local politician and mechanic

See also 
 List of former municipalities of Norway

References

External links 
 

1962 establishments in Norway
1992 disestablishments in Norway
Arendal
Former municipalities of Norway
Populated places disestablished in 1992
Populated places established in 1962